The Sri Lanka cricket team toured Zimbabwe for a three-match Test series and a three-match One Day International (ODI) series between 11 October 1994 and 6 November 1994. The Test series, which was the first played between the two teams, was drawn 0–0 and the ODI series was won 2–1 by Sri Lanka.

Test series

1st Test

2nd Test

3rd Test

ODI series

1st ODI

2nd ODI

3rd ODI

References

External links

1994 in Sri Lankan cricket
1994 in Zimbabwean cricket
International cricket competitions from 1994–95 to 1997
1994-95
Zimbabwean cricket from 1980–81 to 1999–2000